Celebrity Big Brother 2012 may refer to:

Celebrity Big Brother (Indonesian TV series)
Either one of two editions of Celebrity Big Brother which both occurred in 2012
Celebrity Big Brother 9
Celebrity Big Brother 10

 DABs
2012 British television seasons
2012 Indonesian television seasons